"Let the Feelings Go" is a song by Belgian trance project AnnaGrace. The song was a follow-up to their first single "You Make Me Feel" (2008), and like the former, it reached number one on the U.S. Billboard Hot Dance Airplay chart in its 25 July 2009, issue. In the song reached No. 5 on Belgian Charts.

Track listing
CD maxi-single 
 "Let the Feelings Go" (Radio Edit) – 3:26
 "Let the Feelings Go" (Extended) – 6:00
 "Let the Feelings Go" (Peter Luts Remix) – 7:14
 "Let the Feelings Go" (Sem Thomasson Remix) – 6:30
 "Let the Feelings Go" (Hardwell Mix) – 5:56
 "Let the Feelings Go" (Hardwell Dub) – 5:56
 
12" vinyl 
A1. "Let the Feelings Go" (Extended Mix) – 6:00
A2. "Let the Feelings Go" (Sem Thomasson Remix) – 6:31
B1. "Let the Feelings Go" (Peter Luts Remix) – 7:13
B2. "Let the Feelings Go" (Hardwell Mix) – 5:56

Release history

Chart performance

References

2009 songs
2009 singles
AnnaGrace songs
Songs written by Annemie Coenen
Songs written by Peter Luts